Amy Violet Needham (5 June 1876, Mayfair – 8 June 1967, London), was the author of 19 popular novels for children, a number of which, during the 1940s, were made widely available to the British public by BBC's The Children's Hour radio programme.

Early life
Born at 9, John Street, Berkeley Square (now Chesterfield Gardens, W1), London, Needham was the daughter of Colonel Charles Needham, of the 1st Life Guards (illegitimate son of Francis Needham, 2nd Earl of Kilmorey) and Henriette Amélie Charlotte Vincentia (known as 'Amy'), daughter of Dutch aristocrat Vincent Gildemeester Baron van Tuyll van Serooskerken, who had made a fortune in East Indian tin. Charles Needham was a gambler and their finances fluctuated considerably. Violet and her sister Evelyn were educated at home, a common practice for women of their day and social standing.

Needham's early life, spent moving between houses large and small in England and on the continent, is seen as providing the basis for many of her books.

Adult life 

The family spent summer holidays in Europe, and lived there for six years when Needham and her sister were young women, their father being military attaché at Rome from 1895 to 1901. Needham and her family returned to England in 1902 when her mother bought Tylehurst, Forest Row, East Sussex, which would remain the family home for 35 years.

Still living at Tylehurst with her parents, Needham participated in the London season for some years. Summers the Needhams visited family on the continent. Needham's half Dutch mother had four sisters who had variously married English, Austrian, and Dutch nationals, this last the owner of Huys Clingendael, a convenient reunion locale where Needham told stories to younger cousins "Dutch, French, Austrian and English" but gave it up in favour of gardening and home pursuits. Her sister Evelyn married in 1903 and had four sons, and Needham was a devoted aunt, telling bedtime stories which formed the basis of the 'Stormy Petrel' adventures. Her attempts at being published were turned down on the grounds that the work was too difficult for children.

Needham befriended the explorer and alpinist Douglas William Freshfield (d. 1934), a contemporary of her father but with whom she shared many interests. After Freshfield's wife's death in 1911 it has been suggested that the two would have married but for the opposition of Freshfield's family. Following the deaths of Freshfield and her father Charles in 1934 (on the day of Diamond Wedding anniversary), and her mother Amy in 1936, Tylehurst was sold and Violet went to live in London.

Here, through a younger family member, she was able to present the manuscript of 'The Black Riders' to the publishing house William Collins, Sons. Once again, the work was decreed too difficult for children, but, following endorsement by the children of one of the Collins family directors, it was accepted for publication.

Writing
Thus Needham came to writing late in life, publishing her first book, The Black Riders, in 1939, at the age of 63. In her lifetime she published 19 novels.  They can be divided into three groups: Ruritanian, historical, and contemporary. The eleven Ruritanian novels, sometimes known as the Empire series or the Stormy Petrel series, are set in three fictional  countries in Eastern Europe: the Empire, Flavonia, and Ornowitza, the latter being a small duchy between the other two.

The Ruritanian novels fall into two groups. Some, like The Black Riders and The Stormy Petrel are set in the early twentieth century. Others, such as The Woods of Windri and The Changeling of Monte Lucio are set in an undefined mediaeval period with monasteries playing an important role.

Her first novel, The Black Riders, introduces the hero Dick Fauconbois, known as the "Stormy Petrel".  He lives in the Empire, although he visits Flavonia during the course of the novel. It is the story of an orphan boy who becomes a member of a secret rebel movement led by a saint-like figure called Far-Away Moses. Their chief enemy is Count Jasper, known as Jasper the Terrible, the chief of the paramilitary Black Riders. The villain Jasper is described as a darkly attractive character, whose allure is felt by the main female heroine, Wych Hazel. The novelist and poet Michele Roberts described how her childhood reading of The Black Riders "both turned me on and made me feel guilty. Secret pleasure reading it; secret guilt."

Needham is known for writing "characters remarkable among the children's books of the period for having real moral dilemmas, and faults as well as virtues."

Bibliography

Ruritanian
The Black Riders (1939)
The Emerald Crown (1940)
The Stormy Petrel (1942)
The Woods of Windri (1944)
The House of the Paladin (1945)
The Changeling of Monte Lucio (1946)
The Betrayer (1950)
Richard and the Golden Horse Shoe (1954)
The Great House of Estraville (1955)
The Secret of the White Peacock (1956)
The Red Rose of Ruvina (1957)

Contemporary
The Horn of Merlyns (1943)
The Bell of the Four Evangelists (1947)
Pandora of Parrham Royal (1951)
How Many Miles to Babylon? (1953)

Historical
The Boy in Red (1948)
The Avenue (1952)
Adventures at Hampton Court (1954)
Adventures at Windsor Castle (1957)

Legacy 
In the early 1950s, Needham left her London house to live with her widowed sister, subsequently giving up writing after a motor accident. The sisters died a day apart, Violet on the 8 June 1967 and Evelyn the next day.

In the 1940s Needham's books were broadcast on BBC's The Children's Hour, which brought her work to a wide audience in the UK. This young generation of readers included future writer's like Auberon Waugh, Antonia Fraser, Ann Swinfen and A. S. Byatt, Needham invokes a romantic "otherwhere," and makes it familiar, with a subtle, understated magical tone.  As one of the "Last of the Victorians," Needham occupies a position as a little known mother of modern fantasy, with early preoccupations with naming, the nature of magic, and heriosm.

References

Further reading
The Password is Fortitude: an evaluation of some children's books by Violet Needham by Judith Crabb, Hermit Press, South Australia (1992)

1876 births
1967 deaths
English children's writers
20th-century English novelists
20th-century English women writers
English women novelists
People from Forest Row